The Circus of Life (German: Die Flucht in den Zirkus) is a 1926 German silent film directed by Mario Bonnard and Guido Parish and starring Marcella Albani, Vladimir Gajdarov and Fritz Kampers. It was shot at the Staaken Studios in Berlin.The film's art direction was by Andrej Andrejew, Karl Görge and August Rinaldi.

The film was screened in the United Kingdom in 1928, with a reviewer for the Derby Daily Telegraph calling it "one of the best Russian films seen for some time".

Plot
A young nobleman marries a poor peasant girl, who is falsely accused of murder and transported to Siberia. She eventually escapes with her lover.

Cast
 Marcella Albani as Mistress Wera  
 Vladimir Gajdarov as Officer Wladimir Bobrikoff  
 Fritz Kampers as Iwanoff - Anarchist  
 Henry Bender 
 Eugen Burg 
 William Dieterle as Cossack  
 Olga Engl as Mother of Wladimir  
 Karl Harbacher 
 Leopold von Ledebur 
 Hans Mierendorff 
 Hermann Picha 
 Louis Ralph as Boris - Anarchist  
 Frida Richard
 Gerhard Ritterband 
 Guido Parish

References

Bibliography
 Bock, Hans-Michael & Bergfelder, Tim. The Concise CineGraph. Encyclopedia of German Cinema. Berghahn Books, 2009.

External links

1926 films
Films of the Weimar Republic
Films directed by Mario Bonnard
German silent feature films
Films set in Russia
German black-and-white films
UFA GmbH films
Films shot at Staaken Studios